Hadsund North Station was a railway station in Hadsund, Denmark. Opened in 1900 and located near Hadsund Harbour, it served the city until 1 April 1969, when the Aalborg–Hadsund Railway and the Randers–Hadsund Railway closed. The station was demolished in 1985 to make way for a new bus station.

See also
 Hadsund South Station

External links 

 EVP Stationer på Aalborg-Hadsund Jernbane
 Nordjyllands Jernbaner: Hadsundbanen 

Hadsund
Railway stations opened in 1900
Railway stations closed in 1969
Railway stations in Denmark opened in the 20th century